Bishop Damián Nannini is the current serving bishop of Roman Catholic Diocese of San Miguel, Argentina.

Early life and education 
Damián was born in Rosario on 15 September 1961. He completed his studies from Sagrado Corazón College of Rosario and an Carlos Borromeo Seminary in Rosario. He holds a licentiate in Sacred Scripture from the Pontifical Biblical Institute, Rome.

Priesthood 
Damián was ordained a priest on 15 December 1989 by Jorge Manuel López.

Episcopate 
Damián was elected and appointed bishop of San Miguel, Argentina on 7 November 2018 by Pope Francis.

Publications 
La guerra santa en el Antiguo Testamento

El exilio de Judá. Lectura teológica de una crisis histórica

Presentación de la Exhortación Apostólica Gaudete et Exsultate del Santo Padre Francisco sobre el llamado a la santidad en el mundo actual

La misericordia de Dios en la Biblia

References 

Living people
1961 births
21st-century Roman Catholic bishops in Argentina
Bishops appointed by Pope Francis
Pontifical Biblical Institute alumni
People from Rosario, Santa Fe
Roman Catholic bishops of San Miguel (Argentina)